John Paulo Quiambao Prats (born February 14, 1984) is a Filipino comedian, actor, dancer, TV host, director, model and entrepreneur. He started as a child star in year 1992. He is the older brother of actress and former child-star Camille Prats. He was also a former member of the band, JCS.

Prats was a member of ABS-CBN's circle of homegrown talents named Talent Center, now called Star Magic and now currently managed by Cornerstone Entertainment Inc.

In 2000–03, he was paired with Heart Evangelista on the show G-mik, Trip, Ang Tanging Ina, My First Romance and Berks. During the success of their loveteam, they won the (Most Popular Loveteams of RP movies) from 33rd Guillermo Mendoza Memorial Scholarship Foundation.

In 2008, he renewed a contract with ABS-CBN for three more projects, including his special guest appearance of I Love Betty La Fea.

Early and personal life
John Paulo Quiambao Prats was born on February 14, 1984, in Manila, Philippines, to parents Daniel Rafael Prats and Alma Quiambao-Prats, a Kapampangan. Prats has four siblings, including younger sister Camille, who is also an actress. He was educated in OB Montessori and at ABS-CBN Distance Learning Center. Prats is a business management graduate at Thames International Business School. Prats dated actresses Heart Evangelista from 1999 to 2004 and Bianca Manalo in 2011.

On September 24, 2014, Prats organized a flash mob and proposed to his long-time girlfriend Isabel Oli in Eastwood City. On May 16, 2015, Prats and Oli married in Batangas.

Filmography

Film

Television

Concert direction

Discography

Recording album

Single/Soundtrack

Dance albums

Awards

References

External links
 

1984 births
Living people
Filipino male television actors
Filipino male child actors
Filipino male film actors
Filipino male comedians
Filipino people of American descent
Filipino male models
Kapampangan people
Pinoy Big Brother contestants
Male actors from Manila
Star Magic
ABS-CBN personalities
20th-century Filipino male actors
21st-century Filipino male actors